John Cavanagh (born 4 August 1961) is a former English  footballer who played as a defender.

References

1961 births
Living people
English footballers
Association football defenders
Rochdale A.F.C. players
Newcastle KB United players
English Football League players